The NOAA Hurricane Hunters are a group of aircraft used for hurricane reconnaissance by the United States National Oceanic and Atmospheric Administration (NOAA). They fly through hurricanes to help forecasters and scientists gather operational and research data. The crews also conduct other research projects including ocean wind studies, winter storm research, thunderstorm research, coastal erosion, and air chemistry flights.

Organization
The Hurricane Hunters belong to the Aircraft Operations Center (AOC), located at Lakeland Linder International Airport in Lakeland, Florida, United States. The Aircraft Operations Center is under the Office of Marine and Aviation Operations (OMAO), which is a branch of the NOAA, which is in turn an agency of the Department of Commerce. The AOC resided at MacDill AFB from January 1993 to June 2017.

Aircraft
NOAA uses two Lockheed WP-3D Orion turboprops to fly through hurricanes and a Gulfstream IV-SP which flies around the upper fringes of storms to get a read on steering currents. The NOAA also uses light aircraft for some of its research. With permission from Jim Henson Productions, NOAA's P-3s are nicknamed Kermit The Frog (N42RF) and Miss Piggy (N43RF). The G-IV (N49RF) is nicknamed Gonzo.

WP-3D Orion

The WP-3D Orion was designed to tolerate large amounts of turbulence since it flies through the eyes of hurricanes. The WP-3 can be thought of as a flying research lab as it is equipped to take atmospheric measurements. One of the most distinctive parts of the WP-3 is the prominent black, circular belly radome.

Staffed with 18 to 20 crew members, including pilots and scientists, a normal hurricane reconnaissance or research mission can last from 9–10 hours, while a surveillance ("fix" mission) mission will typically last 8 hours, often in rotation with WC-130 flights from the Air Force Reserve Command's 53rd Weather Reconnaissance Squadron (53 WRS) at six-hour intervals. Most often, the scientists and crew aboard the aircraft deploy dropsondes with GPS which collect and transmit data as they descend toward the ocean.  Once this data is received and checked by the crew, it is sent to the NOAA National Hurricane Center for analysis.  Other data is collected and transmitted by request. Personnel on board include pilots, navigators, engineers, technicians, and flight meteorologists (Flight Directors).

Past projects use the WP-3 have included low level jet observation over South America, a bow echo and mesoscale convective study in the Midwest, and ocean wind satellite verification missions over the Northern Atlantic and Pacific.

Gulfstream IV

The Gulfstream IV-SP is a high altitude jet that can fly up to 45,000 feet. The G-IV crew is similar to the WP-3 and includes pilots, engineers, technicians, and a flight meteorologists (Flight Director).

The G-IV flies around the periphery of both tropical and winter storms, including hurricanes, and transmits dropsondes in order to gather data about the surrounding environment.  This information is used to help predict the path of hurricanes. Dropsonde transmissions are collected and checked by an on-board Flight Director, who then transmits the data to the National Centers for Environmental Prediction (NCEP) and the National Hurricane Center (NHC) for analysis.

The G-IV serves the NCEP Winter Storm Reconnaissance program in order to better predict the location and intensity of winter storms that affect the United States. During winter storm reconnaissance, air chemistry measurements are also taken from the upper troposphere.  These flights are typically flown from Honolulu, Anchorage, or Yokota AB, Japan.

See also
 NOAA ships and aircraft
 Storm chasing
 53d Weather Reconnaissance Squadron

References

External links
 NOAA Hurricane Hunters
 The NOAA Hurricane Hunters Flight Science Homepage
 Aircraft Operations Center
 Office of Marine and Aviation Operations
 National Oceanic and Atmospheric Administration

National Oceanic and Atmospheric Administration
Hurricanes in the United States